The architecture of Columbus, Ohio is represented by numerous notable architects' works, individually notable buildings, and a wide range of styles. Yost & Packard, the most prolific architects for much of the city's history, gave the city much of its eclectic and playful designs at a time when architecture tended to be busy and vibrant.

Planning
Columbus was laid out as a planned city, when the state legislature agreed to build a new city in the center of Ohio. As well, Franklinton landowners had donated two  plots in an effort to convince the state to move its capitol there. The two spaces were set to become Capitol Square (for the Ohio Statehouse) and the Ohio Penitentiary. The city was founded on February 14, 1812.

Columbus has experienced numerous short spans of population growth and building development. One early growth took place in the late 19th century, leading many buildings around the city to be constructed in the Richardsonian Romanesque style, popular during that time.

In 1908, the city published one of its most influential urban plans. The 1908 "City Beautiful" plan was an early plan to make more livable spaces, improve the city's economy, and establish several grand public buildings.

Tallest buildings 

The tallest high-rises and skyscrapers in Columbus are:

Rhodes State Office Tower
LeVeque Tower
William Green Building
Huntington Center
Vern Riffe State Office Tower
One Nationwide Plaza
Franklin County Courthouse
AEP Building
Borden Building
Three Nationwide Plaza

Notable architects

Individual architects
 Daniel Burnham (1846-1912)
 Peter Eisenman (1932-)
 W. Byron Ireland (c. 1930-1982)
 Nathan Kelley (1808-1871)
 Frank Packard (1866-1923)
 David Riebel (1855-1935)
 Howard Dwight Smith (1886-1958)
 Elah Terrell (1851-1920)
 Todd Tibbals (1910-1988)
 Joseph W. Yost (1847-1923)

Architecture firms

 Allied Architects Association of Columbus
 Brubaker/Brandt
 DesignGroup
 Harrison & Abramovitz
 Howell & Thomas
 MKSK
 Moody Nolan
 NBBJ
 Richards, McCarty & Bulford
 Schooley Caldwell
 Skidmore, Owings & Merrill
 Stribling & Lum
 Yost & Packard

See also

AIA Columbus
Columbus Register of Historic Properties
List of demolished buildings and structures in Columbus, Ohio
National Register of Historic Places listings in Columbus, Ohio

Further reading

References

External links

 AIA Columbus

Columbus
 
Culture of Columbus, Ohio
Columbus